Kao Chun-ming (6 June 1929 in Tainan – 14 February 2019) was a minister of the Presbyterian Church in Taiwan (PCT). He graduated from Tainan Theological College and Seminary, and then studied at Selly Oak Colleges in England. He was the General Secretary of the PCT from 1970 to 1989, during which period he became a political prisoner for assisting participants in the Kaohsiung Incident (1979), in particular Shih Ming-teh. For this he was sentenced for seven years in prison, and served his sentence from 1980 to 1984. While he was in prison, his wife Ruth Kao organized groups to help him and raised awareness in the worldwide Church about the human rights situation in Taiwan. After Chen Shui-bian was elected President in 2000, Kao Chun-ming was appointed a Senior Advisor to the Office of the President. In 2006 he supported the then-president Chen against his former comrade Shih, who led a movement for a forced resignation of Chen called ‘Million Voices Against Corruption, President Chen Must Go’.

References

External links

 United Reformed Church (2004) A Gift Box. .
 The Lord turned my grief to joy. Address by the Reverend Dr Kao to the general council of the World Alliance of Reformed Churches, Seoul 1989.
 Taipei Times (2001-04-25): Politicians gather to boost new book. Political heavyweights gathered at a ceremony to launch the memoirs of the Reverend Kao Chun-ming, The Path to the Cross: The memoir of the Reverend Kao Chun-ming.
 Taipei Times (2006-09-09): Once comrades, dissidents now share bitter rivalries. Relationship between Kao and Shih.

1929 births
2019 deaths
Senior Advisors to President Chen Shui-bian
Taiwanese Presbyterians
Taiwanese Christian clergy
People from Tainan
20th-century Presbyterian ministers
Taiwanese prisoners and detainees
Prisoners and detainees of Taiwan
Taiwan independence activists